The 1993 Asian Men's Handball Championship was the seventh Asian Championship, which took place from 24 September to 5 October 1993 in Manama, Bahrain.

Preliminary round

Group A

Group B

Group C

Group D

Main round

Group E

Group F

Placement 5th–8th

7th/8th

5th/6th

Final round

Semifinals

Bronze medal match

Gold medal match

Final standing

References
Results

Handball
Asian Handball Championships
A
Handball
September 1993 sports events in Asia
October 1993 sports events in Asia